USS Enceladus (AK-80) (launched 1942) was an  commissioned by the U.S. Navy for service in World War II. She was responsible for delivering goods and equipment to locations in the war zone.

Enceladus was built by the Penn Jersey Shipbuilding Co., Camden, New Jersey, in 1942, acquired and commissioned by the Navy on 18 August 1943.

World War II Pacific Ocean operations 
 
During World War II Enceladus operated entirely in the southwest Pacific Ocean, all the while U.S. Coast Guard manned. She shuttled supplies between supply bases which included Noumea, New Caledonia, Tongatapu, Torokina, Bougainville, Emirau, and Guadalcanal. She was occupied with inter-island freight traffic until 4 August 1945 when she arrived at Pearl Harbor. Enceladus was decommissioned on 18 December 1945 and turned over to the Maritime Commission.

Military awards and honors 

Enceladus’ crew was eligible for the following medals:
 American Campaign Medal
 Asiatic-Pacific Campaign Medal
 World War II Victory Medal

Notes

References

External links 
 

 

Enceladus-class cargo ships
Ships built in Camden, New Jersey
1942 ships
World War II auxiliary ships of the United States